Huang Lei (born 1971) is a Chinese actor, director, singer, screenwriter, and model.

Huang Lei may also refer to:
 Huang Lei (footballer) (born 2002), Chinese footballer 
 Huang Lei (tennis) (born 1986), Chinese tennis player
 Huang Lei (fighter), British Chinese foreign fighter who participated in the Syrian Civil War
 Lei Huang Mendes (born 1982), Chinese-born Portuguese table tennis player